Ocinebrellus lumarius is a species of sea snail, a marine gastropod mollusc in the family Muricidae, the murex snails or rock snails.

References

External links
 Yokoyama M. (1926). Fossil shells from Sado. Journal of the Faculty of Science, Imperial University of Tokyo. Section II, Geology, Mineralogy, Geography, Seismology. 1(8): 249–312, pls. 32–37
 Barco, A.; Herbert, G.; Houart, R.; Fassio, G. & Oliverio, M. (2017). A molecular phylogenetic framework for the subfamily Ocenebrinae (Gastropoda, Muricidae). Zoologica Scripta. 46 (3): 322-335

Ocenebrinae
Gastropods described in 1926